Joan Edwards may refer to:
Joan Edwards (radio singer)
Joan C. Edwards, jazz singer and philanthropist